Road to the Stilt House is a novel by David Adams Richards, published in 1985. The novel centres on Arnold, a teenage boy living in poverty in the Miramichi Valley of New Brunswick, the setting of most of Richards' novels.

The novel was a shortlisted finalist for the Governor General's Award for English-language fiction at the 1985 Governor General's Awards.

References

1985 Canadian novels
Novels by David Adams Richards